Piscu Vechi is a commune in Dolj County, Oltenia, Romania with a population of 2,950 people. It is composed of two villages, Piscu Vechi and Pisculeț. It also included Ghidici village until 2004, when it was split off to form a separate commune.

References

Communes in Dolj County
Localities in Oltenia